The Mundaring Weir Branch Railway was constructed from Mundaring, Western Australia to the site of the Mundaring Weir, and opened on 1 June 1898.

Overview 
One of the rail lines constructed by the Public Works Department in the early 20th century, the line was specifically built for the construction of the weir, and incorporated a zig zag. 

The line taken over by the Western Australian Government Railways some years after its construction.

The branch was popular for picnics and excursions to the weir between the 1920s and 1940s.
The current route of Mundaring Weir Road crosses the formation of the railway at two locations before the site of former No 2 Power station, and is parallel from the Weir road junction to the Mundaring Weir Hotel.

Difficulties
Due to the steep grades down to Mundaring Weir, a limited range of locomotives were permitted to be run on the line.

In the 1940s the declining availability of Msa Garratt steam locomotives affected the number excursion trains that could run to the weir.  This was a particular problem during times when the weir overflowed, because the Msa Garratt seemed to be the only engine in service capable of negotiating the steep gradients.

Due to lack of activity on the line in the early 1950s it was closed on 14 November 1952. A bill to officially close the line passed state parliament in December 1952.

Services on the connecting line, Mundaring Branch Railway, ceased traffic on 23 January 1954. The line was closed by parliament in 1966.

Different proposals since 1966 to resurrect the railway line as a tourist attraction have not materialised.

Stopping places 
The branch commenced to the east of the Mundaring Railway Station yard.

 Mundaring Weir
 Kardo Mordo, adjacent to the Mundaring Weir Hotel and Mundaring Weir Mechanics' Institute
 Portagabra (near the current roundabout intersection turnoff to the Kookaburra Outdoor Cinema). Portagabra was the transfer station for cement railed from the Rivervale cement plant for the works to increase the height of Mundaring Weir in 1948.
 O'Connor, opened as No. 2 Pumping Station in 1922. Renamed O'Connor c.1930. 
 Wonyil, west along the track where the line formation separates from the Mundaring Weir Road)

See also 

 Goldfields Water Supply Scheme
 List of railways constructed by the Public Works Department of Western Australia

References

Further reading

 
 Gunzburg, Adrian.(1968) The Mundaring Weir railway, Perth. Australian Railway Historical Society, W.A. Division (Inc.) Copy held at Battye Library bound with: Port Honey & Companys̀ timber tramway by E.W. Woodland.

External links 
 Route map

Closed railway lines in Western Australia
Mundaring Weir
Eastern Railway (Western Australia)
Railway lines opened in 1898
Railway lines closed in 1954
Railways with Zig Zags